Fahreza Sudin Hi Ibrahim (born 12 August 2000) is an Indonesian professional footballer who plays as a midfielder for Liga 1 club Persita Tangerang.

Club career

Persita Tangerang
He was signed for Persita Tangerang to play in Liga 1 in the 2022 season. Fahreza made his league debut on 25 July 2022 in a match against Persik Kediri at the Indomilk Arena, Tangerang. On 5 December, Fahreza scored his first league goal in the 2022–23 Liga 1 for Persita in a 2–3 loss over Bali United at the Manahan Stadium.

Career statistics

Club

Notes

Honours

Club
Belitong
 Liga 3 Bangka Belitung: 2021

References

External links
 Fahreza Sudin at Soccerway
 Fahreza Sudin at Liga Indonesia

2000 births
Living people
People from Ternate
Sportspeople from North Maluku
Indonesian footballers
Liga 1 (Indonesia) players
Persita Tangerang players
Association football midfielders